The 1999 Kansas State Wildcats football team represented Kansas State University in the 1999 NCAA Division I-A football season  The team's head football coach was Bill Snyder.  The Wildcats played their home games in KSU Stadium.  1999 saw the Wildcats finish with a record of 11–1, and a 7–1 record in Big 12 Conference play.  The season culminated with a win over Washington in the 1999 Holiday Bowl. The Wildcat defense did not give up a score in the third quarter all season.

The Wildcats tied a school record for shutouts in a season with three.  They shutout Temple, Utah State, and Missouri.  The Wildcats shutout Missouri three times in five games in Manhattan between 1991 and 1999.  The Wildcats also shutout three opponents in 1991 and 2002.

Schedule

Rankings

Roster

Game summaries

at #15 Texas

Source: Box Score

K-State won its first ever Big 12 trip to Austin, and first since 1942 (a 64-0 loss).  They beat Texas soundly 48-7 in Manhattan in the 1998 campaign.  David Allen returned a 74 yard punt for a NCAA record-tying touchdown and also scored a running touchdown as Texas turned the ball over a whopping six times.  Kicker Jamie Rheem set a new school record with five field goals from 22, 23, 32, 27, and 20 yards. Linebacker Mark Simoneau scored on a pick six with 8:31 left in the fourth quarter extend the Wildcats' lead to 24-17.  Jonathan Beasley who was removed from the game in the previous week's 35-28 victory over Iowa State relieved a struggling starting quarterback Adam Helm in the second quarter.

at #7 Nebraska

Statistics

Team

Scores by quarter

Offense

Rushing

Passing

Receiving

References

Kansas State
Kansas State Wildcats football seasons
Holiday Bowl champion seasons
Kansas State Wildcats football